The 2022 Israel State Cup Final decided the winner of the 2021–22 Israel State Cup, the 86th season of the Israel State Cup. It was played on 24 May 2022 at the Teddy Stadium in Jerusalem, between Maccabi Haifa and Hapoel Be'er Sheva. Hapoel Beer Sheva beat Maccabi Haifa 3–1 in the penalties, after 2–2 in the game.

Background

Maccabi Haifa had previously played 16 Israel cup Finals, winning 6 of them. Their most recent appearance in the final was in 2015, in which they beat Maccabi Tel Aviv 1–0 to win the State Cup. 

Hapoel Be'er Sheva had previously played 5 Israel cup Finals, winning 2 of them. Their most recent appearance in the final was in 2020, in which they beat Maccabi Petah Tikva 2–0 to win the State Cup.

Road to the final

Match

Details

References

Israel State Cup
State Cup
Cup 2021
Cup 2021
Israel State Cup matches